Esther Carena (born Franziska Lucia Pfeiffer; 24 August 1898 – 26 January 1972) was a German actress. She appeared in more than 30 films between 1916 to 1924.

Biography
The daughter of a German father and Spanish mother, she studied medicine for one semester and trained in an Italian acrobat troupe. Until 1916 she lived mostly in Italy and performed there in stage sketches. 

In 1916 she came to Germany and was discovered by Swedish film actor and director Nils Olaf Chrisander. She was presented as a heroine in thrillers, dramas, and melodramas that were staged by Harry Piel at the end of the First World War. She designed many of her own costumes. In 1924 she married the set designer Franz Schroedter and retired from films.

Selected filmography

References

External links 

1898 births
1972 deaths
German film actresses
German silent film actresses
German stage actresses
20th-century German actresses